Leonardo Loforte (born 4 December 1956) is a Mozambican sprinter. He competed in the men's 400 metres at the 1984 Summer Olympics.

References

External links
 

1956 births
Living people
Athletes (track and field) at the 1984 Summer Olympics
Mozambican male sprinters
Olympic athletes of Mozambique
Place of birth missing (living people)